Simone Malatesta (born 9 February 1982) is an Italian footballer, who plays as a forward for Italian Serie C club Lupa Roma

Career

Juventus and early career
Born in Rome, Lazio, Malatesta started his career at Modena F.C. In January 2000 Malatesta left for Juventus for 400 million Lire (about €206,583) in co-ownership deal. Malatesta left for two Serie C2 clubs in temporary deal in 2000–01 and 2001–02 season. In July 2002 Modena gave up the remain registration rights to Juventus. Malatesta was immediately sold to Valenzana Calcio in another co-ownership deal for a peppercorn fee of €1,000.

Lega Pro clubs
In June 2003 Malatesta joined Valenzana outright. Malatesta played for 4 different clubs from 2005 to 2009. Malatesta joined Venezia in mid-2008 in co-ownership deal. In June 2009 Venezia bought another 50% registration rights from Carpenedolo. However Venezia soon bankrupted.

Parma
Malatesta was signed by Parma F.C. in July 2009, for €10,000, but left for Mantova in another co-ownership deal for €100,000. The Serie B team relegated at the end of season. In June 2010 Parma bought back Malatesta for a peppercorn, days before the bankruptcy of Mantova.

Malatesta left for Carpi and in January 2011 for Pro Vercelli. In July 2011, his loan to Pro Vercelli was renewed for another year.

On 31 August 2012 he was signed by Carrarese along with Nicolò Belotti.

On 1 August 2013 Malatesta joined Italian third division club Ascoli Calcio 1898 in temporary deal. On 11 January 2014 the loan was terminated.

He was signed by Gavorrano in another temporary deal in January 2014.

Serie C clubs
On 6 September 2014 he was signed by Serie C club Lupa Roma.

References

External links
 AIC profile (data by football.it) 

Italian footballers
Modena F.C. players
Juventus F.C. players
Valenzana Mado players
A.C. Prato players
A.C. Carpenedolo players
Venezia F.C. players
Parma Calcio 1913 players
Mantova 1911 players
A.C. Carpi players
F.C. Pro Vercelli 1892 players
U.S. Gavorrano players
Serie B players
Association football forwards
Footballers from Rome
1982 births
Living people
A.S.D. La Biellese players